Mickey Avalon is the self-titled debut album from rapper Mickey Avalon. The album was originally released in 2005 on Shoot to Kill Music and re-released on MySpace Records in association with Interscope/Shoot to Kill Records on November 7, 2006. Avalon describes the album as "a glam rap record about Hollywood's seedy underbelly and the ugliness of my own life."

The popularity of the hidden track "My Dick" eclipsed that of the album itself, due to its being featured in Harold & Kumar Escape from Guantanamo Bay and The Rebound, as well as the TV series Hung and American Dad! The song's lyrics are a series of humorous similes which favorably contrast the rappers' penises with that of another (unspecified) person.

Additionally, "Jane Fonda" was featured briefly in an episode of Entourage and the films The Rebound and  I Hope They Serve Beer in Hell.

Track listing 

Note
 Tracks 11–68 contains silence each lasting for roughly 4 seconds.

References 

2006 debut albums
Mickey Avalon albums